Spilker is a surname. Notable people with the surname include:

Annemarie Spilker (born 1980), Dutch photographer
Linda Spilker (born 1955),  American planetary scientist
James Spilker (born 1933), American engineer and a Consulting Professor in the Aeronautics and Astronautics Department at Stanford University
Marc Spilker (born 1964),  American financial executive and investor